Mohammed Bin Rashid City, also known as MBR City, is a planned mixed-use development in Dubai, United Arab Emirates.

History
In November 2012, the Ruler of Dubai, Mohammed bin Rashid Al Maktoum, announced the establishment of what he termed a new "city" within Dubai. The complex was to contain four components:

 Family tourism, including a park established in collaboration with Universal Studios, with an annual capacity of 35 million visitors and more than 100 hotel facilities, the largest family leisure and entertainment complex in the Middle East, Africa, and Indian subcontinent;
 Retail, featuring the largest mall in the world, the Mall of the World;
 Arts, including the largest area for art galleries in the MENA region; and
 Entrepreneurship and innovation.

The drawings showed the allocated land for the development to be bordered by Emirates Road, Al Khail Road and Sheikh Zayed Road. The complex would also include Mohammad bin Rashid Gardens and the Downtown Dubai, Burj Khalifa, and Business Bay developments.

In 2013, Meydan and Sobha began development of District One, a low-density luxury residential estate within MBR City, as the first phase of development. Crystal Lagoons also began construction of a 40-hectare lagoon, the world's largest man-made lagoon in the world.

In 2019, a 7-bedroom villa in District One was sold for AED 90 million (US$24.5 million), making it the most expensive real estate property sold in Dubai.

See also
 Dubai Hills

References

External links
 

2012 establishments in the United Arab Emirates
Mixed-use developments in the United Arab Emirates
Communities in Dubai